Hyllisia quadricollis is a species of beetle in the family Cerambycidae. It was described by Fairmaire in 1871.

References

quadricollis
Beetles described in 1871
Taxa named by Léon Fairmaire